The New Australasian No.2 Deep Lead Gold Mine, was a goldmine located in Creswick, Victoria, Australia, that is now infamous for being Australia's worst below-ground gold mining disaster.

At 4:45am, Tuesday 12 December 1882, 29 miners became trapped underground by flood waters that came from the flooded parallel-sunk No.1 mine shaft, only five men survived and made it to the surface. Despite two days of frantic pumping and with other equipment transported from the monitor ship HMVS Cerberus, the waters filled the mine shaft. The trapped men scrawled last notes to their loved ones on billy cans before they drowned. Some of these have been kept and still bear the messages, one can, on display in the Creswick Museum says, "We are all happy". The men that perished left 18 widows and 75 dependent children.

Funerals and relief fund
Many of the victims were originally from Cornwall or of Cornish ancestry. Shortly after the accident £13,000 had been raised for the relief fund.

In 1982, the Premier of Victoria, John Cain unveiled The New Australasian No.2 Deep Lead Gold Mining Memorial, which relates the story on a plaque.

The site is listed on the Victorian Heritage Register.

References

External links
 http://www.creswickmuseum.org.au/exhibitions/the-mining-room/australasian-mining-disaster/

Mining disasters in Australia
1882 mining disasters
1882 in Australia
Victorian Heritage Register
Gold mining disasters
December 1882 events
Gold mining in Australia
Mining in Victoria (Australia)